Ornaisons is a commune in the Aude department in southern France.

Geography
The village lies mainly on the left bank of the brook of Aussou, a tributary of the Orbieu, which forms part of the commune's western border, then flows northeast through its northern part.

Population

See also
 Corbières AOC
 Communes of the Aude department

References

Communes of Aude
Aude communes articles needing translation from French Wikipedia